Skinner Glacier may refer to:
 Skinner Glacier (Antarctica)
 Skinner Glacier (Oregon), in Cascade Range, Oregon, United States